Gorman is a former community in Sherman County, Oregon, United States, established in 1892. Its post office opened August 25, 1892, and operated for eight years before closing in 1900. Gorman is contemporarily considered a ghost town.

References

1892 establishments in Oregon
Populated places established in 1892
Ghost towns in Oregon
Former populated places in Sherman County, Oregon
Unincorporated communities in Sherman County, Oregon